Henry James Tattersall (21 December 1892 – 5 November 1971) was a New Zealand cricketer. He played six matches of first-class cricket for Auckland and Wellington between 1913 and 1928. He toured Australia with the New Zealand team in 1913-14 as the second wicket-keeper, but did not play in any of the four first-class matches against state teams.

Before World War I he worked as an engineer in an Auckland foundry. During the war he served overseas in the New Zealand Expeditionary Force as a sergeant.

After the war he settled on 557 acres at Akitio which he had been granted after a ballot under the Discharged Soldiers Settlement Act. In April 1921 he married Muriel Childs. They had a son in 1922 but separated soon afterwards and divorced in 1927. He moved to Wellington.

See also
 List of Auckland representative cricketers

References

External links
 

1892 births
1971 deaths
New Zealand cricketers
Auckland cricketers
Wellington cricketers
Cricketers from Christchurch
New Zealand military personnel of World War I